The Senior men's race at the 1983 IAAF World Cross Country Championships was held in Gateshead, England, at the Riverside Park on March 20, 1983.   A report on the event was given in the Glasgow Herald and in the Evening Times.

Complete results, medallists, 
 and the results of British athletes were published.

Race results

Senior men's race (11.994 km)

Individual

Teams

Note: Athletes in parentheses did not score for the team result

Participation
An unofficial count yields the participation of 213 athletes from 31 countries in the senior men's race, one athlete less than the official number published.

 (9)
 (8)
 (8)
 (8)
 (6)
 (2)
 (1)
 (4)
 (3)
 (8)
 (9)
 (9)
 (9)
 (2)
 (8)
 (9)
 (1)
 (8)
 (9)
 (8)
 (6)
 (9)
 (9)
 (9)
 (9)
 (6)
 (6)
 (5)
 (9)
 (9)
 (7)

See also
 1983 IAAF World Cross Country Championships – Junior men's race
 1983 IAAF World Cross Country Championships – Senior women's race

References

Senior men's race at the World Athletics Cross Country Championships
IAAF World Cross Country Championships